Youth studies is an interdisciplinary academic field devoted to the study of the development, history, culture, psychology, and politics of youth. The field studies not only specific cultures of young people, but also their relationships, roles and responsibilities throughout the larger societies which they occupy. The field includes scholars of education, literature, history, politics, religion, sociology, and many other disciplines within the humanities and social sciences. Youth studies encourages the understanding of experiences that are predominantly manifested among young people, generalized phenomenon and social change. The majority of 15- to 24-year-olds in 2008 lived in developing countries.  The definition of youth varies across cultural contexts. The social experience and organization of time and space are important themes in youth studies.  Scholars examine how neoliberalism and globalization affect how young people experience life, including in comparison to previous generations.

Topics
Youth voice
Youth development
History of youth (category)
Youth culture
Psychology
Youth politics 
Children's geographies
Youth empowerment
Youth rights
Civic engagement
Youth participation
Criminalization
Youth service
Youth courts
Youth work
Adultism
Adultcentrism
Ephebiphobia

Scholars
 Judith Bessant 
danah boyd
Andy Bennett
Shane Blackman
Fred Cartmel
Alan France
Andy Furlong
Henry Giroux
John Goodwin
Anita Harris
 Annelies Kamp (sociologist)
Robert MacDonald
Mike A. Males
Margaret Mead
Henrietta O'Connor
Ken Roberts
Tracy Shildrick
Kate Tilleczek
Dan Woodman
Johanna Wyn

Scholarly and academic journals
International Journal of Child, Youth & Family Studies.
Journal of Youth Studies
Youth Studies Australia
Vulnerable Children and Youth Studies
 Journal of Early Adolescence,  (electronic)  (paper)

See also
 August Aichhorn
 Australian Clearinghouse for Youth Studies
 Child abuse
 CommonAction
 Forum for Youth Investment
 List of youth topics
 Sociology of the family
 The Wave Trust
 Adolescent suicide

References

Bessant, J., 2021, Making-Up People: Youth, Truth and Politics, Routledge

Bibliography
Bassani, C. (2007) "Five Dimensions of Social Capital Theory as They Pertain to Youth Studies." Journal of Youth Studies, 10 (1) February 2007, pages 17–34.
Tsekeris, C. and Stylianoudi, L. (2017) "Youngsters and Adolescents in Troubled Contexts: Worldwide Perspectives." Contemporary Social Science: Journal of the Academy of Social Sciences, 12 (3-4) December 2017, pages 165-174.

External links
Youth Studies Research Guide. RMIT (Australia).
Center for Youth Studies - A religious organization (U.S.).
Youth Studies at the School of Social Work, University of Minnesota (U.S.).
Australian Clearinghouse for Youth Studies.
Children and Youth Studies major. Open College (U.K.).
Carnegie Young People Initiative. (U.K.)
CYFERNet: Children, Youth and Families Education and Research Network. (U.S.).
Department of Child and Youth Studies at Brock University (Canada).
Children and Youth Studies Caucus, American Studies Association, Georgetown University.
Youth Studies Certification Program. CUNY. (U.S.)
Youth Studies Net, City University of Hong Kong.
Child and Youth Studies Institute Association of African Universities (Senegal).

Adolescence
Social sciences
S